MetalSucks is a heavy metal music-themed news website. The site features reviews, interviews, information on latest metal releases and blog-like posts from the writers, most notably Vince Neilstein and Axl Rosenberg.

History
The site was founded in December 2006 by authors Ben Umanov and Matthew Goldenberg who use the pen names Vince Neilstein and Axl Rosenberg.

In April 2009, MetalSucks was awarded Metal Hammer's Web of Death Award for "Best Reviews" for its "honest, insightful, unpretentious – and fun – reviews."

On October 4, 2009, one of the writers for MetalSucks was accused of leaking the album Axe to Fall by Converge onto the internet prior to its official release. The site formally apologized for the leak.

On April 12, 2011, F.Y.E. released the MetalSucks Fan Pack, a CD compilation that included 20 bands and a T-shirt. The item was exclusive only to F.Y.E. stores.

On August 15, 2011, MetalSucks announced The Metal Suckfest, a two-day music festival to take place in Manhattan on November 4 and 5 of that same year. Municipal Waste and Cynic were announced as headliners. If the inaugural festival is a success, there are plans to make it an annual event.

In 2017, Rosenberg co-wrote a non-fiction book about heavy metal with Christopher Krovatin.

In 2022, MetalSucks was acquired by entertainment company The Orchard, a subsidiary of Sony. Rosenberg and Neilstein both announced the news on their personal Twitter accounts, revealing they would be leaving the company entirely after a "transition period" and that Christopher Krovatin would be reprising his role as the "Emperor Rhombus" pseudonym to take over as editor.

References

External links
 

2006 establishments in the United States
American entertainment news websites
American music websites
American blogs
Heavy metal music
Heavy metal publications
Internet properties established in 2006
Magazines established in 2006
Music blogs
Music magazines
Music review websites
Online music magazines published in the United States